Nicole "Sis" Bates is a former American college softball player for the Washington Huskies. She is also a member of the US National softball team.

Early life
Bates was born and raised in Ceres, California where she grew up playing baseball with her brother, Jimmy, which earned her the nickname of "Sis". During her high school years, Bates traveled 12 hours every Sunday to practice with her club team, Firecrackers Rico, in southern California. She graduated from Ceres High School in 2016 and attended the University of Washington.

Playing career
Bates began her collegiate career for the Washington Huskies in 2017. During her freshman year she led the team and conference in triples with six, one shy from tying the program's single-season record. 

She helped lead the team to three consecutive Women's College World Series appearances from 2017 to 2019. She became the sixth Husky to compile 200 or more hits in her first three seasons. She hit .529 in 15 games before the 2020 season was abruptly cancelled due to the COVID-19 pandemic. 

She has a .385 career batting average and hit .571 in 2020. She made zero errors in 2020 and two in 166 chances in 2019. She was named the Greatest Softball Shortstop of All Time by ESPN in 2020. She finished her career as the all-time leader in hits in program history.

She now plays professionally as a shortstop in the Athletes Unlimited league.

References 

People from Ceres, California

1998 births
Living people
Washington Huskies softball players